was a town located in Iwate District, Iwate Prefecture, Japan.

The villages of Arasawa and Tayama were created on April 1, 1889, within Ninohe District with the establishment of the municipality system. These villages merged on September 30, 1956, to create the town of Ashiro. On April 1, 2002, Ashiro was transferred from Ninohe District to Iwate District. On September 1, 2005, Ashiro, along with the town of Nishine, and the village of Matsuo (all from Iwate District), was merged to create the city of Hachimantai and no longer exists as an independent municipality.

As of September 2005, the town had an estimated population of 5,841 and a population density of 12.69 persons per km2. The total area was 460.24 km2.

External links
 Official website of Hachimantai 

Dissolved municipalities of Iwate Prefecture
Hachimantai, Iwate